Natural Bridge Battlefield State Historic Site is a Florida State Park in Leon County, Florida. It is located roughly between the city of Tallahassee and the town of St. Marks. During the American Civil War, the Battle of Natural Bridge was fought here on March 6, 1865. The site is named for a natural bridge over the St. Marks River. The Civil War Trust, a division of the American Battlefield Trust, and its partners have acquired and preserved 110 acres of the battlefield park.

Recreational Activities
The park has picnicking areas.

Gallery

References

External links

 Natural Bridge Battlefield Historic State Park at Florida State Parks
 Natural Bridge Battlefield State Historic Site at Absolutely Florida

State parks of Florida
National Register of Historic Places in Leon County, Florida
Florida in the American Civil War
American Civil War battlefields
Natural arches of Florida
Parks in Leon County, Florida
Conflict sites on the National Register of Historic Places in Florida
American Civil War on the National Register of Historic Places
American Civil War museums in Florida